Charlotteville is a village lying on the northeastern tip of Tobago on Man-o-War Bay.

History

The first European settlement on Man-o-War Bay was part of the colony of Nieuw Walcheren established by Jan de Moor, the burgomaster of Vlissingen in the Netherlands. The first settlement, established in 1633, was abandoned, but the settlement was reestablished by fresh settlers from the Netherlands in 1639. New Walcheren was destroyed by the Spanish from Trinidad in 1636, and most of the colonists were executed.

After various failed attempts at European colonisation, Tobago was designated a neutral island in the 1748  Treaty of Aix-la-Chappelle. The Treaty of Paris in 1763 ended Tobago's status as a neutral territory and brought it under British control, and a plantation economy was established on the island. These estates, which were purchased by the Turpin family in 1853, constitute Charlotteville.

Geography 

The history of the village is closely linked to sugar farming, and Charlotteville's harbour was also of importance for the town's development. In more recent times fishing has been important for Charlotteville's economy.

Charlotteville has one of the few remaining tamboo bamboo bands in which rhythms are produced by banging bamboo on the ground. This originated in slavery times when slaves were not allowed to play musical instruments. Today a saxophone player is in the band.

There are a few small restaurants. There are no large hotels; there are only a few small guesthouses and apartments to rent. There is a beach in the village and Pirate's Bay is twenty minutes' walk along a track.

Hidden at the other side of the village is Pirates Bay, also known as "Little Italy" for its popularity in playing football.

References

Populated places in Tobago
Villages in Trinidad and Tobago